Thitarodes latitegumenus is a species of moth of the family Hepialidae. It is found in Yunnan, China.

References

Moths described in 1997
Hepialidae
Moths of Asia